Naval captain may refer to:
Captain (naval), the name most often given in English-speaking navies to the rank corresponding to command of the largest ships
Captain at sea, a rank equivalent to Captain (naval) in non-English-speaking countries such as Germany and the Netherlands
Sea captain, a licensed mariner in ultimate command of the vessel